Robert John Blackburn (February 1, 1938 in Rouyn, Quebec and raised in Teck, Ontario – October 24, 2016) was a Canadian professional ice hockey player. Blackburn played 135 games in the National Hockey League for the New York Rangers and Pittsburgh Penguins.

Career statistics

External links

1938 births
2016 deaths
Baltimore Clippers players
Canadian ice hockey defencemen
Ice hockey people from Ontario
Ice hockey people from Quebec
New York Rangers players
Pittsburgh Penguins players
Sportspeople from Kirkland Lake
Sportspeople from Rouyn-Noranda